Marsha J. Berger (born 1953) is an American computer scientist. Her areas of research include numerical analysis, computational fluid dynamics, and high-performance parallel computing. She is a Silver Professor of Computer Science and Mathematics in the Courant Institute of Mathematical Sciences of New York University.

Berger was elected to the National Academy of Engineering in 2005 for developing adaptive mesh refinement algorithms and software that have advanced engineering applications, especially the analysis of aircraft and spacecraft.

Education
Berger received her B.S. in mathematics from State University of New York at Binghamton-Harpur College in 1974. She went on to receive an M.S. and a Ph.D in computer science from Stanford University in 1978 and 1982, respectively.

Career and research
Berger's research includes high-performance parallel computing, numerical analysis, and computational fluid dynamics. Specifically she develops software and engineering applications for the spacecraft and aircraft industries. Berger worked at Argonne National Laboratory as a scientific programmer after graduating from SUNY. Her specific duties included developing models for the Energy and Environmental Systems Division. During her time at Stanford, she became associated with the Stanford Linear Accelerator Center. After graduating with her Ph.D., she began working at the Courant Institute of Mathematical Sciences at New York University, first as a postdoc, then as a faculty member. Berger has served as the deputy director of the Courant Institute and still serves as an educator at NYU.

Awards and recognition
Berger was the recipient of the Presidential Young Investigator Award, courtesy of the National Science Foundation, in 1988. She received another award from the NSF in 1991, this time a Faculty Award for Women. In 2002, Berger received the NASA Software of the Year Award for Cart3D. In 2000 Berger was elected to the National Academy of Sciences. In 2004, she received the IEEE Sidney Fernbach Award. In 2005 Berger was elected to the National Academy of Engineering.
She is one of two 2019 winners of the Norbert Wiener Prize in Applied Mathematics. In addition, Berger is a fellow of the Society for Industrial and Applied Mathematics.

See also
 Adaptive mesh refinement

References

1953 births
Living people
American women computer scientists
American women mathematicians
American computer scientists
Harpur College alumni
New York University faculty
Stanford University alumni
Courant Institute of Mathematical Sciences faculty
Fellows of the Society for Industrial and Applied Mathematics
Members of the United States National Academy of Engineering
20th-century American mathematicians
21st-century American mathematicians
21st-century American women scientists
20th-century American women scientists